Singapore–United Kingdom relations, also referred to as British–Singaporean relations, are the relations between the states of Singapore and the United Kingdom. Both countries are full members of the Commonwealth of Nations and are marked by historical, cultural, institutional and language ties, extensive people-to-people links, aligned security interests, sporting tournaments, and significant trade and investment co-operation.

Country comparison

History

Britain first established a settlement on the island of Singapore in 1819 under Sir Thomas Stamford Raffles, and took possession of the whole island in 1823.  It formally became a British colony in 1824, and remained in British hands (apart from the Japanese occupation of 1941-45) until 1963, when the island was granted its independence. Between 1963-65, Singapore formed part of Malaysia. The British Armed Forces maintained a presence in Singapore at the request of the founding Prime Minister Lee Kuan Yew for stability reasons and to allow for a gradual transition to independence and self-reliance. After the end of the Malayan Emergency and Konfrontasi, the British military gradually withdrew during the 1960s and 1970s, with the infrastructure turned over to the fledgling Singapore Armed Forces.

As a result of the long historical relationship, English is one of Singapore's 4 official languages (see Singapore English).

Bilateral relations

The United Kingdom co-operates with Singapore on a wide range of international issues. Singapore's non-permanent membership of the UN Security Council (2001/02) further intensified bilateral contacts on key issues affecting international peace and security. The UK and Singapore have also been closely co-operating in the area of counter terrorism and counter proliferation, both politically and operationally.

Defence

Since 1971, the two countries have co-operated militarily through the Five Power Defence Arrangements, which involve annual joint exercises with other partners Malaysia, Australia and New Zealand. The UK has a defence attache in Singapore and a logistics supply depot, known as the British Defence Singapore Support Unit (BDSSU), in Sembawang. In contrast, Singapore has no military attache in their High Commission in London. An EU Centre report suggests that Singapore's defence attache to the UK is located in the Embassy in Paris. A recent news report stated that the UK wished to increase its defence cooperation with Singapore.

Trade and investment

Singapore is the United Kingdom's largest trading partner in Southeast Asia, with two thirds of UK exports to this region flowing into Singapore. UK exports of goods only to Singapore in 2010 were valued at £3.29billion, a 15% increase from 2009 while imports of goods from Singapore in 2010 were valued at £3.99billion, an 18% increase from 2009. The top exports of UK goods to Singapore are power generating machinery, beverages and general industrial machinery while the top exported goods from Singapore were organic chemical, power generating machinery and office machines. As of 2009, Singapore was the UK's 11th largest market for services exports. 
 
There are few import tariffs from Singapore who supports the World Trade Organization process fully. Singapore was the first ASEAN country to commence negotiations with the EU for a bilateral Free Trade Agreement (FTA).

The UK is the fourth largest foreign investor in Singapore with cumulative stock of £23.5 billion at end 2009. There are over 31,000 British nationals and some 700 British companies in Singapore. Many of the major long-term British investors have increased their footprint in Singapore recently, including Barclays, Dyson, HSBC, Rolls-Royce, Shell and Standard Chartered. There has also been a significant increase in the number of British SMEs entering the market and British universities establishing collaborative partnerships with Singapore's educational institutions.

The UK attracts over two thirds of all Singaporean investment into the European Union with a cumulative stock of £20.6 billion with financial and insurance services, real estate and ICT being the most significant sectors.

State visits

In 2011, 6 dignitaries from the United Kingdom visited Singapore including Peter Ricketts, the National Security Advisor in January, Martin Donnelly, BIS Permanent Secretary in February, John Aston, FCO Special Representative for Climate Change in March, Jeremy Browne, Minister of State at the Foreign and Commonwealth Office in April, Liam Fox, Secretary of State for Defence in June and The Duke of York in September. The two Singaporean dignitaries who visited the United Kingdom in 2011 are Ow Foong Pheng, Permanent Secretary Singapore Ministry of Trade & Industry in September and Tony Tan, President of Singapore in December. In October 2014, Tony Tan made the first official state visit of a President of Singapore to the United Kingdom and was hosted by Queen Elizabeth and the Duke and Duchess of Cambridge.

Academic exchanges

Education links between Singapore and the United Kingdom are strong. As of 2011, more than 3,000 Singaporeans were studying in the United Kingdom and the British Council estimate that around 80,000 UK qualifications are awarded annually in Singapore through "twinning" programmes. Due to Singapore's membership in the Commonwealth, Singaporean students qualify for scholarships such as the Commonwealth Scholarship and Fellowship Plan and Chevening Scholarship to further their studies in the United Kingdom. Links in the arts are also strong with many British artists and organisations being invited to perform and the established presence of British music examination boards such as ABRSM.

The British Council has a large presence teaching English to around 20,000 Singaporeans and foreign nationals. Current British Council projects focus on the internationalisation of education, developing young leaders to take action against climate change and the exchange of knowledge and expertise in the arts and creative industries.

Resident diplomatic missions

 Singapore has a high commission in London.
 United Kingdom has a high commission in Singapore.

See also
 High Commission of Singapore, London
 List of High Commissioners of the United Kingdom to Singapore
 Singaporeans in the United Kingdom

Notes

References 

 
Bilateral relations of the United Kingdom
United Kingdom
Relations of colonizer and former colony
Singapore and the Commonwealth of Nations
United Kingdom and the Commonwealth of Nations